Lee Ya-hsuan (born 20 July 1995) is a Taiwanese tennis player.

She has career-high WTA rankings of 186 in singles, achieved on 11 April 2016, and 138 in doubles, set on 6 February 2017.

Playing for the Chinese Taipei Fed Cup team, Lee has a win–loss record of 3–13.

WTA 125 tournament finals

Doubles: 2 (2 titles)

ITF Circuit finals

Singles: 19 (12 titles, 7 runner–ups)

Doubles: 20 (10 titles, 10 runner–ups)

Notes

References

External links
 
 
 

1995 births
Living people
Taiwanese female tennis players
Universiade medalists in tennis
Sportspeople from Taipei
Universiade gold medalists for Chinese Taipei
Universiade silver medalists for Chinese Taipei
Medalists at the 2019 Summer Universiade
Medalists at the 2017 Summer Universiade
Medalists at the 2015 Summer Universiade
21st-century Taiwanese women